2021 California Senate Bill 9 (SB 9), titled the California Housing Opportunity and More Efficiency (HOME) Act, is a 2021 California state law which creates a legal process by which owners of certain single-family homes may either build two 800-square-foot homes or one duplex on their property, to result in a maximum of four housing units on a formerly single-family lot, and prohibits cities and counties from directly interfering with those who wish to build such homes. Drafted by State Senator Scott Wiener, it was signed into law by Governor Gavin Newsom in September 2021, and went into effect on January 1, 2022. The bill was crafted to reduce the cost of housing in California by increasing housing supply and density within California cities and overriding municipal and county zoning laws requiring single-family zoning. The law also expands the capacity for secondary suites (also known in California as accessory dwelling units). 

It is estimated that around 500,000 (1 in 20) households across California would be able to qualify under SB 9. The law also has several exceptions, including the exclusion of historic districts, and a condition prohibiting the same owner from splitting adjacent lots.

See also

References

Further reading 
 
 
 
 
 
 

Zoning in the United States
California statutes